Dennis Raymond Knapp (May 13, 1912 – December 25, 1998) was a United States district judge of the United States District Court for the Southern District of West Virginia.

Education and career

Born in Bee, West Virginia, Knapp received an Artium Baccalaureus degree from West Virginia University Institute of Technology in 1932, a Master of Arts from West Virginia University in 1934, and a Bachelor of Laws from West Virginia University College of Law in 1940. He was in private practice in Nitro, West Virginia from 1940 to 1942. He was an attorney for the  United States War Department from 1942 to 1944. He was in the United States Army as a Sergeant from 1944 to 1946. He was in private practice in Nitro from 1946 to 1956. He was city attorney of Nitro from 1948 to 1956. He was a judge of the Court of Common Pleas for Kanawha County, West Virginia from 1957 to 1970.

Federal judicial service

On December 8, 1970, Knapp was nominated by President Richard Nixon to a new seat on the United States District Court for the Southern District of West Virginia created by 84 Stat. 294. He was confirmed by the United States Senate on December 16, 1970, and received his commission on December 18, 1970. He served as Chief Judge from 1973 to 1982. He assumed senior status on February 25, 1983, and served in that capacity until his death on December 25, 1998, in South Charleston, West Virginia.

References

Sources
 

1912 births
1998 deaths
Military personnel from West Virginia
Judges of the United States District Court for the Southern District of West Virginia
People from Nitro, West Virginia
United States Army soldiers
United States Department of War officials
United States district court judges appointed by Richard Nixon
20th-century American judges
West Virginia lawyers
West Virginia county court judges
West Virginia University alumni
West Virginia University College of Law alumni
West Virginia University Institute of Technology alumni
West Virginia city attorneys
20th-century American lawyers